Ekamra may refer to:
 Ekamra-Bhubaneswar,  a Vidhan Sabha constituency of Khordha district, Odisha, India
 Ekamra Kanan, a botanical garden in Bhubaneswar, India
 Ekamra Manoranjan TV, Odia language cable television channel
 Ekamra Walks, a weekly heritage walk organised in Bhubaneswar, Odisha
 Nilachakra Ekamra, Odia language cable television channel